The Man in Blue is the title of two films:

 The Man in Blue (1925 film), a silent drama starring Herbert Rawlinson
 The Man in Blue (1937 film), a drama starring Robert Wilcox